Roland Schrammel (born 11 September 1968) is an Austrian former footballer.

References

1968 births
Living people
Association football goalkeepers
Austrian footballers
Austrian Football Bundesliga players
SK Rapid Wien players